Orallo is a rural locality in the Maranoa Region, Queensland, Australia. In the ,Orallo had a population of 41 people.

History 
The locality's name Orallo comes from the Orallo railway station name, assigned by the Queensland Railways Department on11 November 1915, reportedly an Aboriginal word meaning shade.

Orallo Provisional School opened circa 1918. On 1 October 1922 it became Orallo State School. It closed in 1927.

References 

Maranoa Region
Localities in Queensland